{{DISPLAYTITLE:C9H18O2}}
The molecular formula C9H18O2 (molar mass: 158.24 g/mol) may refer to:

 Ethyl heptanoate
 Heptyl acetate
 Nonanoic acid
 Pentyl butyrate, or amyl butyrate
 Propyl hexanoate